Michael Eric Saipe (born September 10, 1973) is an American former professional baseball player. Saipe played for the Colorado Rockies of Major League Baseball (MLB) in the 1998 season. In two games, Saipe had a 0–1 record with a 10.80 ERA.

Career
He batted and threw right-handed.

Saipe was born in San Diego, California, and is Jewish. He attended University City High School in San Diego, and the University of California, San Diego in La Jolla, California. Saipe also attended the University of San Diego, where he played college baseball for the Toreros from 1992 to 1994. In 1992 and 1993, he played collegiate summer baseball with the Cotuit Kettleers of the Cape Cod Baseball League and was named a league all-star in 1993. He was drafted by the Rockies in the 12th round of the 1994 Major League Baseball Draft.

References

External links

1973 births
Living people
American expatriate baseball players in Canada
American expatriate baseball players in Mexico
Baseball players from San Diego
Bend Rockies players
Carolina Mudcats players
Colorado Rockies players
Colorado Springs Sky Sox players
Cotuit Kettleers players
Edmonton Trappers players
American expatriate baseball players in Italy
Greenville Braves players
Jewish American baseball players
Jewish Major League Baseball players
Las Vegas 51s players
Las Vegas Stars (baseball) players
Long Beach Breakers players
Major League Baseball pitchers
Mexican League baseball pitchers
New Haven Ravens players
Richmond Braves players
Rimini Baseball Club players
Sacramento River Cats players
Salem Avalanche players
San Diego Toreros baseball players
Saraperos de Saltillo players
University of California, San Diego alumni
21st-century American Jews